23:59 is a 2011 Singaporean-Malaysian horror film directed by Gilbert Chan.

Plot 
In 1983, a platoon of recruits are about to complete basic training on a jungle island (based on Pulau Tekong). They hear a ghost story which says that a mad woman living on the island had died at 23:59 (11:59 PM) and her spirit would return to haunt the camp at the same time. Tan, the platoon outcast, tries to convince his buddy, Jeremy, that he is being haunted by the woman's ghost, but Jeremy does not believe him.

When the platoon embarks on a route march in the jungle, Tan goes missing and ends up being found dead. Although the recruits and their sergeant believe that Tan's death was due to supernatural forces, their officer insists that it was an accident. Jeremy has a nightmare about seeing Tan's ghost indicating that Chester, another recruit, will be next to die.

The following night, Chester is possessed by a spirit and has to be restrained until a priest is called in to exorcise him. Jeremy later confronts Chester about Tan's death and learns that Chester and Tan had encountered the ghost of a woman on the night they did guard duty together. Jeremy has also seen the same ghost a few times since the night of Tan's death.

Jeremy and Chester ask a local and find out that the woman was a medium who had given birth to a deformed girl. The girl grew up being ostracised due to her appearance and because she and her mother were believed to be cursed.

That night, Chester and Jeremy hear a strange noise and follow it into the jungle, where Chester is killed by an unseen force. Jeremy injures his leg while trying to flee and unknowingly takes shelter in the medium's house. He finds the medium's skeleton on a rocking chair and encounters her ghost again. She tells him that she was not responsible for the recruits' deaths; it was actually her daughter's ghost who killed them. It turns out that years ago, the medium had poisoned her daughter to death and then committed suicide. Jeremy is possessed by the medium's ghost, who apologises and reconciles with her daughter's ghost. The sergeant and two recruits eventually find Jeremy in the house. He recovers and returns home safely after completing basic training.

In the present day, three recruits talk about the same ghost story on the island. When it is 23:59, they hear the same strange noise.

Cast

Release 
23:59 was released in Singapore on 3 November 2011 and in Malaysia on 29 December 2011.

References

External links 
 

2011 horror films

Singaporean horror films
Malaysian horror films
Films set in 1983
2011 films
Chinese-language Malaysian films
Malaysian multilingual films
2011 multilingual films
Singaporean multilingual films